The 15th Pan American Games were held in Rio de Janeiro, Brazil from July 13 to July 29, 2007.

Medals

Gold

Men's 400 metres: Chris Brown
Men's 4x400 metres Relay: Andrae Williams, Avard Moncur, Michael Matheau, and Chris Brown

Silver

Men's High Jump: Donald Thomas
Women's 400 metres: Christine Amertil

Bronze

Women's 100 metres: Chandra Sturrup
Women's Javelin: Laverne Eve

Women's 4 × 100 m medley relay: Alana Dillette, Alicia Lightbourne, Arianna Vanderpool, Nikia Deveaux

Results by event

See also
Bahamas at the 2006 Commonwealth Games
Bahamas at the 2008 Summer Olympics

External links
Rio 2007 Official website

Nations at the 2007 Pan American Games
2007
Pan American Games